Nell's Eugenic Wedding is a lost 1914 silent comedy of one reel directed by Edward Dillon. It is a primitive example by Anita Loos of what is called in modern terms a Gross-out film. Tod Browning, here just an actor, would later achieve renown as a director. Most reviewers 'damned' the film as repugnant or tasteless.

Plot
A man devours a bar of soap and later vomits everywhere he goes.

Cast
Fay Tincher - Nell
Tod Browning - 
Joseph Belmont - Policeman(*billed Baldy Belmont)
Edward Dillon
Max Davidson

References

External links

1914 films
Lost American films
Films directed by Edward Dillon
Films based on short fiction
American silent short films
Silent American comedy films
1914 comedy films
1914 short films
American black-and-white films
American comedy short films
1914 lost films
Lost comedy films
1910s American films